Stadion Dimitar Burkov is a stadium in Targovishte, Bulgaria. It has a capacity of 10,000 spectators.  It is the home ground of Svetkavitsa Targovishte.

References

Football venues in Bulgaria
Buildings and structures in Targovishte Province
Sport in Targovishte